Leptobrachium tagbanorum is a species of frog in the family Megophryidae from Palawan, Philippines.

References

tagbanorum
Amphibians described in 2010